Maggie Tinsman (born July 14, 1936) was a Republican member of the Iowa State Senate from 1989 to 2007. She has since run a lobbying group involved in issues related to early childhood education.

Tinsman is an alumnus of the University of Colorado and the University of Iowa. Before her election to the state senate she served for 10 years as a Scott County Supervisor.

Sources
Biography from Tinsman's website
Page on Tinsman from Iowa State Senate website
Iowa legislature bio of Tinsman

1936 births
County supervisors in Iowa
Republican Party Iowa state senators
University of Colorado alumni
University of Iowa alumni
Living people
20th-century American politicians
21st-century American politicians
Iowa Women's Hall of Fame Inductees